The 1921–22 Ottawa Senators season was the club's 37th season of play, fifth season in the NHL, and they were coming off back-to-back Stanley Cup Championship seasons, winning in 1920 and 1921. The Senators would finish in first place in the standings, but lost in the playoff to the Toronto St. Pats.

Regular season
Punch Broadbent emerged as the offensive leader for the Senators, leading the NHL in goals (32) and points (46).  He scored in an NHL record 16 straight games.  Teammate Cy Denneny finished in 2nd in NHL scoring with 39 points, and 3rd in goals at 27.

On February 1, former Senators player Sprague Cleghorn, then on the Montreal Canadiens, cut Senators players Eddie Gerard and Cy Denneny, while taking a charge at Frank Nighbor.  All 3 players missed 2 games due to the injuries they occurred, while Cleghorn was given a match penalty and fined $15 by the league.

Clint Benedict once again had a great season, winning an NHL best 14 games, while leading the league with a 3.34 GAA.

On February 11, 1922, the Senators and the Toronto St. Pats made NHL history, as the teams played to a 4–4 draw, the first time in NHL history that a game ended in a tie.

December
 December 17 – The Senators opened the 1921-22 season on the road at Barton Street Arena against the Hamilton Tigers. Punch Broadbent led the Senators, scoring the overtime winning goal and adding an assist, in a 3-2 victory.
 December 21 – Ottawa hosted the Toronto St. Patricks for their home opener. Eddie Gerard scored three goals, however, the St. Patricks Babe Dye scored the tie-breaking goal midway through the third period, as Ottawa dropped the game to Toronto by a score of 5-4.
 December 24 – The Montreal Canadiens came to Ottawa for a Christmas Eve match against the Senators. Cy Denneny scored three goals and added an assist, Morley Bruce scored twice and Punch Broadbent had a goal and three assists as Ottawa crushed Montreal 10-0. Clint Benedict earned the shutout.
 December 28 – The Senators made their first visit of the season to Mount Royal Arena as they faced the Montreal Canadiens in the second game of a home-and-home series. Punch Broadbent scored the overtime winning goal, as Clint Benedict allowed only one goal in a 2-1 Senators victory.
 December 31 – Ottawa was back on home ice to face the Hamilton Tigers for a New Year's Eve game. Cy Denneny scored two goals and added an assist, while Clint Benedict earned his second shutout of the season, as Ottawa defeated Hamilton 4-0.

Ottawa earned a record of 4-1-0 during December, getting eight points. The Senators sat in first place in the NHL, two points ahead of the second place St. Patricks.

January
 January 4 – Ottawa opened the New Year with a road game at Mutual Street Gardens to face the Toronto St. Patricks. Cy Denneny had a goal and an assist, however, Billy Stuart of Toronto broke the tie with a late third period goal, as Toronto defeated Ottawa 3-2.
 January 7 – Ottawa was on the road for a game against the Montreal Canadiens. Punch Broadbent scored twice while Georges Boucher earned two assists, leading the Senators to a 4-2 win over Montreal.
 January 11 – The Senators returned to home ice for a first-place clash against the Toronto St. Patricks, as both clubs had a 5-2-0 record heading into the game. Georges Boucher and Cy Denneny each scored twice, leading the Senators to a convincing 7-2 win over the St. Patricks, and take over first place in the NHL standings.
 January 14 – The Senators travelled to Toronto for the second game of a home-and-home series. With the game tied at 2-2 in the third period, Cy Denneny broke the tie to give the Senators the lead with his second goal of the game. Punch Broadbent then scored two goals, as Ottawa defeated Toronto 5-2.
 January 18 – Ottawa returned home to host the Montreal Canadiens. Punch Broadbent and Cy Denneny each scored three goals, while Eddie Gerard added three assists, as the Senators defeated the Canadiens in a very high-scoring game 10-6. Odie Cleghorn scored four goals for the Canadiens.
 January 21 – The Senators were back on the road for a visit against the Hamilton Tigers. The Senators held a 4-1 lead after the first period, however, the Tigers stormed back and won the game as Mickey Roach scored the overtime winner to take the victory 7-6. Punch Broadbent had three goals and an assist in the losing effort.
 January 25 – Ottawa was back on home ice for the second game of a home-and-home series against the Hamilton Tigers. Cy Denneny and Punch Broadbent each scored twice, leading Ottawa to a 4-2 victory.
 January 28 – Ottawa headed to Toronto for a matchup against the Toronto St. Patricks. Punch Broadbent scored two second period goals as the Senators held on to defeat the St. Patricks 2-1 after a strong goaltending performance from Clint Benedict.

The Sens had a record of 6-2-0 in the month of January. Overall, the Senators had a 10-3-0 record, earning 20 points on the season, and in first place in the NHL. They were six points ahead of the second place St. Patricks.

February
 February 1 – Ottawa travelled to Montreal for a game against the Montreal Canadiens. Punch Broadbent and Frank Boucher each scored twice, as Ottawa defeated Montreal 4-2. During the game, former Senators player Sprague Cleghorn accumulated 29 minutes of penalties for the Canadiens.
 February 4 – The Senators hosted the Hamilton Tigers. Ottawa stormed out to a 6-0 lead, however, the Tigers scored four goals in 2:30 late in the second period to cut the lead to 6-4. Ottawa pulled away in the third period, winning the game 10-6. King Clancy scored two goals and added two assists, while Georges Boucher, Frank Boucher and Leth Graham each scored twice.
 February 8 – The Senators faced the Hamilton Tigers again, this time on the road. Punch Broadbent scored the lone Ottawa goal, as the Tigers, led by three goals and an assist by Mickey Roach and three goals by Joe Malone, crushed the Senators 9-1, snapping Ottawa's four game winning streak.
 February 11 – Ottawa was back on home ice for a meeting against the Toronto St. Patricks. The Senators held a 4-1 lead late in the second period, however, the St. Patricks scored three unanswered goals to tie the game at 4-4. There was no scoring in overtime, as this marked the first ever tie game in NHL history. Georges Boucher scored twice in the tie.
 February 15 – The Senators were on the road for a game against the Montreal Canadiens. Ottawa took a 6-2 lead with 3:30 left in the second period, however, the Canadiens scored four times to tie the game. For the second straight game, overtime settled nothing, as the teams skated to a 6-6 tie. Punch Broadbent scored twice while Eddie Gerard scored a goal and added two assists.
 February 18 – Ottawa continued their road trip with a game against the Hamilton Tigers. Frank Nighbor scored a goal and added two assists, as Ottawa snapped a three game winless streak with a 4-2 victory.
 February 22 – Ottawa returned home to face the Montreal Canadiens. Punch Broadbent scored twice and added an assist, as the Senators held off the Canadiens for a 4-3 victory. The win improved Ottawa's record to 14-4-2 and clinch first place in the NHL standings, earning a berth in the O'Brien Cup.
 February 25 – The Senators travelled to Toronto for a road game against the second place Toronto St. Patricks. Cy Denneny scored four goals, however, Reg Noble scored twice and added four assists for Toronto, as the St. Patricks defeated Ottawa 7-5.

The team finished February with a 4-2-2 record in eight games. The Senators overall win–loss record was 14-5-2, earning 30 points and clinching first place in the NHL.

March
 March 1 – The Senators opened March with a home game against the Toronto St. Patricks in the second game of a home-and-home series. Cy Denneny and Eddie Gerard recorded goals for the Senators, but the St. Patricks defeated Ottawa 3-2.
 March 4 – Ottawa travelled to face the Montreal Canadiens for their final road game of the regular season. The Senators, resting some of their regular players, lost to the Canadiens 2-1. Cy Denneny scored the lone goal for Ottawa.
 March 8 –  The Senators concluded the regular season with a home game against the Hamilton Tigers. The Senators once again rested some of their regular players in preparation for the playoffs. Punch Broadbent and Eddie Gerard scored for Ottawa, however, Mickey Roach scored three goals and added two assists for Hamilton, as the Senators lost the game 7-2.

Ottawa had a 0-3-0 record in March. Overall, the club finished with the best record in the NHL, with a 14-8-2 record.

Final standings

Record vs. opponents

Schedule and results

Playoffs
Toronto St. Patricks 5, Ottawa Senators 4
The Senators would once again play for the O'Brien Cup, where they would face the Toronto St. Patricks in a two game total goal series.

Game 1 - The series opened on March 11 in Toronto. The St. Patricks took a very early 2-0 lead, with two goals in the first 3:05 of the game. The Senators responded with three straight goals, as Frank Nighbor scored 7:05 into the game, followed by two goals by Cy Denneny, to give Ottawa a 3-2 lead heading into the first intermission. The St. Pats tied the game with a goal by Babe Dye 8:30 into the second period, however, Ottawa regained the lead as Frank Nighbor scored his second of the game, giving the Senators a 4-3 lead. Dye would once again tie the game with a very late goal, as the two teams were tied 4-4 after two periods. In the third period, the St. Patricks Corb Denneny scored the game winning goal with five minutes remaining in the game, giving the St. Patricks a 5-4 series lead after the first game.
Game 2 - The series moved to Ottawa for the second game on March 13. It was a very defensive contest, as Ottawa could not break through and the two teams fought to a 0-0 tie. With this result, Toronto won the series 5 goals to 4 and would represent the NHL at the 1922 Stanley Cup Finals.

Playing stats

Scoring leaders

Goaltending

Transactions
The Senators were involved in the following transactions during the 1921–22 season.

Trades

Free agents

See also
 1921–22 NHL season

References
SHRP Sports
The Internet Hockey Database
National Hockey League Guide & Record Book 2007

Ottawa Senators (original) seasons
Ottawa
Ottawa